Samaritan Hebrew is a reading tradition used liturgically by the Samaritans for reading the Ancient Hebrew language of the Samaritan Pentateuch, in contrast to Tiberian Hebrew among the Jews.

For the Samaritans, Ancient Hebrew ceased to be a spoken everyday language and was succeeded by Samaritan Aramaic, which itself ceased to be a spoken language some time between the 10th and 12th centuries and was succeeded by Arabic (or more specifically Samaritan Palestinian Arabic).

The phonology of Samaritan Hebrew is very similar to that of Samaritan Arabic, and is used by the Samaritans in prayer. Today, the spoken vernacular among Samaritans is evenly split between Modern Israeli Hebrew and Palestinian Arabic, depending on whether they reside in Holon (Israel) or in Shechem (i.e. Nablus, in Palestine's Area A).

History and discovery

The Samaritan language first became known in detail to the Western world with the publication of a manuscript of the Samaritan Pentateuch in 1631 by Jean Morin. In 1616 the traveler Pietro della Valle had purchased a copy of the text in Damascus, and this manuscript, now known as Codex B, was deposited in a Parisian library.

Between 1957 and 1977 Ze'ev Ben-Haim published in five volumes his monumental Hebrew work on the Hebrew and Aramaic traditions of the Samaritans. Ben-Haim, whose views prevail today, proved that modern Samaritan Hebrew is not very different from Second Temple Samaritan, which itself was a language shared with the other residents of the region before it was supplanted by Aramaic.

Orthography

Samaritan Hebrew is written in the Samaritan alphabet, a direct descendant of the Paleo-Hebrew alphabet, which in turn is a variant of the earlier Phoenician alphabet.

The Samaritan alphabet is close to the script that appears on many Ancient Hebrew coins and inscriptions.  By contrast, all other varieties of Hebrew, as written by Jews, employ the later square Hebrew alphabet, which is in fact a variation of the Aramaic alphabet that Jews began using in the Babylonian captivity following the exile of the Kingdom of Judah in the 6th century BCE. During the 3rd century BCE, Jews began to use this stylized "square" form of the script used by the Achaemenid Empire for Imperial Aramaic, its chancellery script while the Samaritans continued to use the Paleo-Hebrew alphabet, which evolved into the Samaritan alphabet.

In modern times, a cursive variant of the Samaritan alphabet is used in personal affects.

Samaritan Hebrew letter pronunciation
Consonants

Vowels

Phonology

Consonants

Vowels

Phonemic length is contrastive, e.g.  רב 'great' vs.  רחב 'wide'. Long vowels are usually the result of the elision of guttural consonants.

In other cases, stressed  shifts to  when that syllable is no longer stressed, e.g.  דברתי but דברתמה .  and  only contrast in open post-tonic syllables, e.g. ידו  'his hand' ידיו  'his hands', where  stems from a contracted diphthong.

Stress

Stress generally differs from other traditions, being found usually on the penultimate and sometimes on the ultimate.

Grammar

Pronouns

Personal

Demonstrative

Relative

Who, which: éšar.

Interrogative
 Who? = mi.
What? = ma.

Noun

When suffixes are added, ê and ô in the last syllable may become î and û: bôr (Judean bohr) "pit" > búrôt "pits". Note also af "anger" > éppa "her anger".

Segolates behave more or less as in other Hebrew varieties: beţen "stomach" > báţnek "your stomach", ke′seph "silver" > ke′sefánu (Judean Hebrew kaspe′nu) "our silver", dérek > dirkakimma "your (m. pl.) road" but áreş (in Judean Hebrew: e'rets) "earth" > árşak (Judean Hebrew arts-ekha) "your earth".

Article

The definite article is a- or e-, and causes gemination of the following consonant, unless it is a guttural; it is written with a he, but as usual, the h is silent. Thus, for example: énnar / ánnar = "the youth"; ellêm = "the meat"; a'émor = "the donkey".

Number

Regular plural suffixes are
 masc: -êm (Judean Hebrew -im)
 eyyamêm "the days"
 fem: -ôt (Judean Hebrew: -oth.)
 elamôt "dreams"

Dual is sometimes -ayem (Judean Hebrew: a′yim), šenatayem "two years", usually -êm like the plural yédêm "hands" (Judean Hebrew yadhayim.)

Tradition of Divine name

Samaritans have the tradition of either spelling out loud with the Samaritan letters

"Yohth, Ie', Baa, Ie' "

or saying "Shema"  meaning "(The Divine) Name" in Aramaic, similar to Judean Hebrew "Ha-Shem" .

Verbs

Particles

Prepositions

"in, using", pronounced:
 b- before a vowel (or, therefore, a former guttural): b-érbi = "with a sword"; b-íštu "with his wife".
 ba- before a bilabial consonant: bá-bêt (Judean Hebrew: ba-ba′yith) "in a house", ba-mádbar "in a wilderness"
 ev- before other consonant: ev-lila "in a night", ev-dévar "with the thing".
 ba-/be- before the definite article ("the"): barrášet (Judean Hebrew: Bere'·shith') "in the beginning"; béyyôm "in the day".

"as, like", pronounced:
 ka without the article: ka-demútu "in his likeness"
 ke with the article: ké-yyôm "like the day".

"to" pronounced:
 l- before a vowel: l-ávi "to my father", l-évad "to the slave"
 el-, al- before a consonant: al-béni "to the children (of)"
 le- before l: le-léket "to go"
 l- before the article: lammúad "at the appointed time"; la-şé'on "to the flock"

"and" pronounced:
 w- before consonants: wal-Šárra "and to Sarah"
 u- before vowels: u-yeššeg "and he caught up".

Other prepositions:
 al: towards
 elfáni: before
 bêd-u: for him
 elqérôt: against
 balêd-i: except me

Conjunctions

 u: or
 em: if, when
 avel: but

Adverbs

 la: not
 kâ: also
 afu: also
 ín-ak: you are not
 ífa (ípa): where?
 méti: when
 fâ: here
 šémma: there
 mittét: under

References

Bibliography
J. Rosenberg, Lehrbuch der samaritanischen Sprache und Literatur, A. Hartleben's Verlag: Wien, Pest, Leipzig.

External links
 
 

Hebrew
Canaanite languages
Language and mysticism
Samaritan culture and history